Tarcisius Gervazio Ziyaye (19 May 1949 – 14 December 2020) was a Malawian Roman Catholic archbishop.

Ziyaye was born in Malawi and was ordained to the priesthood in 1977. He served as titular bishop of Macon and auxiliary bishop of the Roman Catholic Diocese of Dedza, Malawi, from 1991 to 1993. 

He was appointed Coadjutor Bishop of Lilongwe in 1993 and became Bishop of  Lilongwe in 1994. In 2001 Ziyaye was appointed  Archbishop of Blantyre.

He was  Archbishop of Lilongwe from 2013 until his death in 2020.

Notes

External links

1949 births
2020 deaths
Malawian Roman Catholic archbishops
Roman Catholic archbishops of Lilongwe
Roman Catholic archbishops of Blantyre
Roman Catholic bishops of Lilongwe